I Like It may refer to:

 "I Like It" (Cardi B, Bad Bunny and J Balvin song), a 2018 song
 "I Like It" (DeBarge song), a 1982 song by the family singing quintet DeBarge
 "I Like It" (Dino song), a 1989 song by Dino 
 "I Like It" (Enrique Iglesias song), a 2010 song
 I Like It (EP), a 2011 EP by South Korean group ChoColat
 "I Like It" (Foxy Shazam song), a 2011 song by American rock band Foxy Shazam
 "I Like It" (Gerry & the Pacemakers song), a 1963 song
 "I Like It", a song by Irving Berlin
 "I Like It"  (Narcotic Thrust song), a 2004 song by Narcotic Thrust
 "I Like It" (Overweight Pooch song), a 1991 song by Overweight Pooch featuring CeCe Peniston
 "I Like It" (Sammie song), a 1999 song by American R&B singer Sammie
 "I Like It" (Sevyn Streeter song)
 "I Like It" (The Blackout All-Stars song)
 "I Like It", 1952 song by Rosita De La Vega
 "I Like It", a song by Lacuna Coil from the album Shallow Life (2009)
 "I Like It", a song by So Def, produced by Missy Elliott
 "I Like It", a song by Cheryl from A Million Lights, 2012
 "I Like It", a song by Take That from III, 2014
 "I Like It", a song by Nëither which represented Washington, D.C. in American Song Contest

See also 
 I Like (disambiguation)
 "I Like It, I Love It", a 1995 song by Tim McGraw
 I Like It Like That (disambiguation)
 I Love It (disambiguation)